Professional certification, trade certification, or professional designation, often called simply certification or qualification, is a designation earned by a person to assure qualification to perform a job or task. Not all certifications that use post-nominal letters are an acknowledgement of educational achievement, or an agency appointed to safeguard the public interest.

Overview 
A certification is a third-party attestation of an individual's level of knowledge or proficiency in a certain industry or profession. They are granted by authorities in the field, such as professional societies and universities, or by private certificate-granting agencies. Most certifications are time-limited; some expire after a period of time (e.g., the lifetime of a product that required certification for use), while others can be renewed indefinitely as long as certain requirements are met. Renewal usually requires ongoing education to remain up-to-date on advancements in the field, evidenced by earning the specified number of continuing education credits (CECs), or continuing education units (CEUs), from approved professional development courses.

Many certification programs are affiliated with professional associations, trade organizations, or private vendors interested in raising industry standards. Certificate programs are often created or endorsed by professional associations, but are typically completely independent from membership organizations. Certifications are very common in fields such as aviation, construction, technology, environment, and other industrial sectors, as well as healthcare, business, real estate, and finance.

According to The Guide to National Professional Certification Programs (1997) by Phillip Barnhart, "certifications are portable, since they do not depend on one company's definition of a certain job" and they provide potential employers with "an impartial, third-party endorsement of an individual's professional knowledge and experience".

Certification is different from professional licensure. In the United States, licenses are typically issued by state agencies, whereas certifications are usually awarded by professional societies or educational institutes. Obtaining a certificate is voluntary in some fields, but in others, certification from a government-accredited agency may be legally required to perform certain jobs or tasks. In other countries, licenses are typically granted by professional societies or universities and require a certificate after about three to five years and so on thereafter. The assessment process for certification may be more comprehensive than that of licensure, though sometimes the assessment process is very similar or even the same, despite differing in terms of legal status.

The American National Standards Institute (ANSI) defines the standard for being a certifying agency as meeting the following two requirements:
 Delivering an assessment based on industry knowledge that is independent from training courses or course providers
 Granting a time-limited credential to anyone who meets the assessment standards

The Institute for Credentialing Excellence (ICE) is a U.S.-based organization that sets standards for the accreditation of personnel certification and certificate programs based on the Standards for Educational and Psychological Testing, a joint publication of the American Educational Research Association (AERA), the American Psychological Association (APA), and the National Council on Measurement in Education (NCME). Many members of the Association of Test Publishers (ATP) are also certification organizations.

Categorization   
There are three general types of certification. Listed in order of development level and portability, they are: corporate (internal), product-specific, and profession-wide.

Corporate, or "internal" certifications, are made by a corporation or low-stakes organization for internal purposes. For example, a corporation might require a one-day training course for all sales personnel, after which they receive a certificate. While this certificate has limited portability – to other corporations, for example – it is the most simple to develop.

Product-specific certifications are more involved, and are intended to be referenced to a product across all applications. This approach is very prevalent in the information technology (IT) industry, where personnel are certified on a version of software or hardware. This type of certification is portable across locations (for example, different corporations that use that software), but not across other products. Another example could be the certifications issued for shipping personnel, which are under international standards even for the recognition of the certification body, under the International Maritime Organization (IMO).

The most general type of certification is profession-wide. Certification in the medical profession is often offered by particular specialties. In order to apply professional standards, increase the level of practice, and protect the public, a professional organization might establish a certification. This is intended to be portable to all places a certified professional might work. Of course, this generalization increases the cost of such a program; the process to establish a legally defensible assessment of an entire profession is very extensive. An example of this is a Certified Public Accountant (CPA), which would not be certified for just one corporation or one piece of accountancy software but for general work in the profession.

Professional certificates awarded by tertiary education providers
Many tertiary education providers grant professional certificates as an award for the completion of an educational program. The curriculum of a professional certificate is most often in a focused subject matter. Many professional certificates have the same curriculum as master's degrees in the same subject. Many other professional certificates offer the same courses as master's degrees in the same subject, but require the student to take fewer total courses to complete the program. Some professional certificates have a curriculum that more closely resembles a baccalaureate major in the same field.  The typical professional certificate program is between 200 and 300 class-hours in size. It is uncommon for a program to be larger or smaller than that. Most professional certificate programs are open enrollment, but some have admissions processes. A few universities put some of their professional certificates into a subclass they refer to as advanced professional certificates.

Some of the more commonly offered professional certificates include:
 Professional Certificate in Accounting (PCA)
 Professional Certificate in Accounting and Finance (PCAF)
 Professional Certificate in Taxation (PCIT)
 Professional Certificate in Transfer Pricing (PCITP)
 Professional Certificate in Contract Management (PCCM)
 Professional Certificate in Customer Relationship Management (PCCRM)
 Professional Certificate in Facility Management (PCFM)
 Professional Certificate in Financial Planning (PCFP)
 Professional Certificate in Graphic Design (PCGD)
 Professional Certificate in Small Business Management (PCSBM)
 Professional Certificate in Human Resources (PCHR)
 Professional Certificate in Marketing (PCM)
 Professional Certificate in Digital Marketing (PCDM)
 Professional Certificate in Paralegal Studies (PCPS)
 Professional Certificate in Project Management (PCPM)
 Professional Certificate in Supply Chain Management (PCSCM)
 Professional Certificate in Store Management (PCSM)
 Professional Certificate in Materials Management (PCMM)
 Professional Certificate in Technical Communication (PCTC)

Advanced professional certificate 
Advanced professional certificates are professional credentials designed to help professionals enhance their job performance and marketability in their respective fields. In many other countries, certificates are qualifications in higher education. In the United States, a certificate may be offered by an institute of higher education. These certificates usually signify that a student has reached a standard of knowledge of a certain vocational subject. Certificate programs can be completed more quickly than associate degrees and often do not have general education requirements.

An advanced professional certificate is a result of an educational process designed for individuals. Certificates are designed for both newcomers to the industry as well as seasoned professionals. Certificates are awarded by an educational program or academic institution. Completion of a certificate program indicates completion of a course or series of courses with a specific concentration that is different from an educational degree program. Course content for an advanced certificate is set forth through a variety of sources i.e. faculty, committee, instructors, and other subject matter experts in a related field. The end goal of an advanced professional certificate is so that professionals may demonstrate knowledge of course content at the end of a set period in time.

Areas of certification

Accountancy, auditing and finance 

There are many professional bodies for accountants and auditors throughout the world; some of them are legally recognized in their jurisdictions.
Public accountants are the accountancy and control experts that are legally certified in different jurisdictions to work in public practices, certifying accounts as statutory auditors, eventually selling advice and services to other individuals and businesses. Today, however, many work within private corporations, financial industry, and government bodies.

Accounting and external auditing 
Cf. Accountancy qualifications and regulation
 CPA (Chartered Professional Accountant), the unified accounting designation in Canada conferred by CPA Canada.
 CA or Chartered Accountant conferred by the Institute of Chartered Accountants of India.
 Institute of Chartered Accountants within the Commonwealth e.g. Australia and New Zealand, South Africa, Canada (before merger into CPA).  With mutual recognition with each other and with the UK
 ACA, FCA or CA (Chartered Accountant) conferred by Institutes of Chartered Accountants in various territories, namely the United Kingdom of Great Britain and Northern Ireland and the Republic of Ireland.
 ACMA or FCMA (Associate or Fellow Chartered Management Accountant) conferred by the Chartered Institute of Management Accountants (UK)
 Associate or Fellow Chartered Certified Accountant (ACCA or FCCA) conferred by Association of Chartered Certified Accountants (UK)
 AFA or FFA (Associate or Fellow Incorporated Financial Accountant) conferred by the Institute of Financial Accountants (UK)
 AAIA or FAIA (Associate or Fellow International Accountant) conferred by Association of International Accountants
 MIPA or FIPA (Member or Fellow of the Institute of Public Accountants who use the designation "Public Accountant") conferred by the Institute of Public Accountants (Australia)
 CPA (Certified Public Accountant) conferred by State Accountancy Boards in the US, Hong-Kong, Canada ...
 CMA (Certified Management Accountant) conferred by Institute of Certified Management Accountants (ICMA in Australia), Institute of Management Accountants (IMA in US)
 CCC (Chartered Cost Controllers) issued and conferred by the American Academy of Financial Management USA Certifying Board (AAFM)
 CFS (Certified Finance Specialist) conferred by IQN

Internal auditing and fraud combat 
 cAAP (Certified Agile Auditor Professional) awarded by cRisk Academy for proficiency in Agile Auditing
 cCAE (Certified Chief Audit Executive) awarded by cRisk Academy for proficiency in starting and running an Internal Audit department
 cORCM (Certification in Objective-Centric Risk and Certainty Management) awarded by cRisk Academy 
 cPIA (Certified Practitioner in Internal Audit) awarded by cRisk Academy for proficiency in Internal Auditing
 cRBIA (Certified Risk-Based Internal Auditor) awarded by cRisk Academy for proficiency in Risk-Based Internal Auditing
 CIA (Certified Internal Auditor): CCSA, Certification in Control Self Assessment; CGAP, Certified Government Auditing Professional; CRMA, Certification in Risk Management Assurance; QIAL, Qualification in Internal Audit Leadership, conferred by the internationally recognized Institute of Internal Auditors (IIA) headquartered in Lake Mary, Florida, with chapters in many countries
 CFE (Certified Fraud Examiner) conferred by the Association of Certified Fraud Examiners (ACFE) headquartered in Texas with chapters in many countries
 CFF (Certified in Financial Forensics) awarded by the American Institute of CPAs
 CISA (Certified Information Systems Auditor) awarded by the Information Systems Audit and Control Association headquartered in the US with chapters in many countries
 CAMS (Certified Anti-Money Laundering Specialist) offered by Association of Certified Anti-Money Laundering Specialists (ACAMS) and advanced CAMS
 CGSS (Certified Global Sanctions Specialist) conferred by Association of Certified Anti-Money Laundering Specialists (ACAMS) 
CSA (Certified Strategic Auditor) conferred by Association of Certified Strategic Auditors (ACSA) https://www.acsaglobal.com
IACCP (Investment Adviser Certified Compliance Professional) conferred by the Investment Adviser Association (IAA) and National Regulatory Services (NRS)
CPERM (Certified Professional in Enterprise Risk Management) conferred by the Academy of Professional Certification Company (APC) which endorsed by HKSARG

Finance 
 CFS (Certified Finance Specialist) conferred by IQN
 CFA (Chartered Financial Analyst) conferred by CFA Institute (CFA)
 ChFM Chartered Financial Manager  conferred by International Board of Standards
 CIIA (Certified International Investment Analyst) conferred by the Association of Certified International Investment Analysts (ACIIA)
IACCP (Investment Adviser Certified Compliance Professional) conferred by the Investment Adviser Association (IAA) and National Regulatory Services (NRS)

Investments 
 CFS (Certified Finance Specialist) conferred by IQN
 CFA (Chartered Financial Analyst) conferred by CFA Institute (CFA)
 ChFM Chartered Financial Manager  conferred by International Board of Standards
 CIPM (Certificate in Investment Performance Measurement) conferred by CFA Institute (CFA)
 CIIA (Certified International Investment Analyst) conferred by the Association of Certified International Investment Analysts (ACIIA)
 ASA (Accredited Senior Appraiser), AM (Accredited Member), and CEIV (Certified in Entity and Intangible Valuations) conferred by the American Society of Appraisers
 CBV (Chartered Business Valuator) conferred by the CBV Institute.
 CVA (Certified Valuation Analyst) conferred by the NACVA.
 CAIA (Chartered Alternative Investment Analyst) conferred by the CAIA Association
IACCP (Investment Adviser Certified Compliance Professional) conferred by the Investment Adviser Association (IAA) and National Regulatory Services (NRS)
 FRM (Financial Risk Manager) conferred by Global Association of Risk Professionals (GARP)
 PRM (Professional Risk Manager) conferred by Professional Risk Managers' International Association (PRMIA)
 FMVA (Financial Modeling and Valuation Analyst) conferred by Corporate Finance Institute (CFI).
 CQF (Certificate in Quantitative Finance), conferred by the CQF Institute

Payroll 
 CPP (Certified Payroll Professional) and FPC (Fundamental Payroll Specialist) conferred by the American Payroll Association.
 Payroll Compliance Practitioner (PCP) and Certified Payroll Manager (CPM) conferred by the National Payroll Institute

Personal finance 
 CFS (Certified Finance Specialist) conferred by IQN
 CFA (Chartered Financial Analyst) conferred by CFA Institute (CFA)
 ChFM Chartered Financial Manager  conferred by International Board of Standards
 CFP (Certified Financial Planner) conferred by Certified Financial Planner Board of Standards and Financial Planning Standards Board
 CCP (Certified Credit Professional) issued to credit management professionals in Canada by the Credit Institute of Canada
 EA (Enrolled Agent) by the Internal Revenue Service (IRS)
 CFC (Certified Financial Consultant) conferred by the Institute of Financial Consultants

Public finance 
 CCMT (Certified California Municipal Treasurer) conferred by California Municipal Treasurers Association (CMTA)
 CGAP (Certified Government Auditing Professional) conferred by the Institute of Internal Auditors, based on the US Government Auditing Standards (Yellow Book) and additionally on COSO, IIA standards and INTOSAI ISSAI standards recognized worldwide in public finance
 CDFM (Certified Defense Financial Manager) conferred by American Society of Military Comptrollers (ASMC)
 CFO (Certified Financial Officer) conferred by the Carl Vinson Institute of Government of the University of Georgia
 CGFM (Certified Government Financial Manager) conferred by Association of Government Accountants (AGA)
 CGAT (Certified Governmental Accounting Technician), conferred by Government Finance Officers Association of Alabama
 CGFO (Certified Government Finance Officer) conferred by Government Finance Officers Association of Texas (GFOAT)
 CGFO (Certified Government Finance Officer), conferred by Florida Government Finance Officers Association (FGFOA)
 CGFO (Certified Government Finance Officer) conferred by Louisiana Government Finance Officers Association
 CMFO (Certified Municipal Finance Officer) conferred by Government Finance Officers of New Jersey, Rutgers University, and the State of New Jersey
 CMFO (Certified Municipal Finance Officer) conferred by Tennessee Comptroller of the Treasury and the Municipal Technical Advisory Service
 CPFO (Certified Public Finance Officer) conferred by Government Finance Officers Association
 CPFA (Certified Public Finance Administrator) conferred by Association of Public Treasurers of the United States and Canada (APTUSC)
 GFO (Government Finance Officer) conferred by Government Finance Officers Association of South Carolina (GFOASC)
 North Carolina Local Governmental Finance Officer conferred by North Carolina Government Finance Officers Association and the North Carolina Association of County Finance Officers

Aging services 
 Certified Aging in Place Specialist (CAPS)
 Certified Daily Money Managers
 Certified Elder Law
 Certified Living in Place (CLIPP)
 Certified Senior Advisor (CSA)
 Certified At-risk Adult Crime Tactics Specialist (CACTS)
 Cognitive Care Certification (CCC)

Architecture 
 AIA (Member, American Institute of Architects) conferred by American Institute of Architects
 FAIA (Fellow, American Institute of Architects) conferred by American Institute of Architects
 RA (Registered Architect) conferred by National Council of Architecture Registration Boards
 NCARB (Certified) issued by National Council of Architecture Registration Boards – this allows for state-state reciprocity.

Archival science, information privacy, and records management 
 CA (Certified Archivist), conferred by Academy of Certified Archivists
 CIP (Certified Information Professional) conferred by AIIM
 CIPM (Certified Information Privacy Manager) conferred by International Association of Privacy Professionals
 CIPP (Certified Information Privacy Professional) conferred by International Association of Privacy Professionals
 CIPT (Certified Information Privacy Technologist) conferred by International Association of Privacy Professionals
 CRA (Certified Records Analyst) conferred by Institute of Certified Records Managers
 CRM (Certified Records Manager) conferred by Institute of Certified Records Managers
 IGP (Information Governance Professional) conferred by ARMA International

Aviation 
Aviators are certified through theoretical and in-flight examinations. Requirements for certifications are quite equal in most countries and are regulated by each National Aviation Authority. The existing certificates or pilot licenses are:
 SPL (Sport Pilot License) conferred by the FAA (Federal Aviation Administration)
 PPL (Private Pilot License) conferred by the FAA (Federal Aviation Administration) or JAA (Joint Aviation Authorities)
 CPL (Commercial Pilot Licence) conferred by the FAA (Federal Aviation Administration) or JAA (Joint Aviation Authorities)
 ATP (Airline Transport Pilot) conferred by the FAA (Federal Aviation Administration) or JAA (Joint Aviation Authorities)

Licensing in these categories require not only examinations but also a minimum number of flight hours. All categories are available for Fixed-Wing Aircraft (airplanes) and Rotatory-Wing Aircraft (helicopters). Within each category, aviators may also obtain certifications in:
 Instrument Flight Rules (IFR)
 Multi-engine aircraft
 Turbojet Engines
 Jet Engines
 Experimental aircraft
 Amphibious aircraft
 Seaplanes
Usually, aviators must be certified also in their log books for the type and model of aircraft they are allowed to fly. Currency checks as well as regular medical check-ups with a frequency of 6 months, 12 months, or 36 months, depending on the type of flying permitted, are obligatory. An aviator can fly only if holding:
 A valid pilot license
 A valid medical certificate
 Valid certifications for the type of aircraft and type of flight.

In Europe, the ANSP, ATCO & ANSP technicians are certified according to EUROCONTROL Safety Regulatory Requirement (ESARRs) (according to EU regulation 2096/2005 "Common Requirements").

Biomedical 
 BMD (Biomedical Electronics Technician) conferred by Electronics Technicians Association
 BIET (Biomedical Imaging Electronics Technician) conferred by Electronics Technicians Association

Business 
 CSA (Certified Strategic Auditor) conferred by Association of Certified Strategic Auditors (ACSA)
 CSM (Certified Strategic Manager) conferred by IQN
 CPSM (Certified Professional in Supply Management) conferred by Institute for Supply Management (ISM)
 CPSD (Certified Professional in Supplier Diversity) conferred by Institute for Supply Management (ISM)

Chiropractic

Communications 
In the United States, several communications certifications are conferred by the Electronics Technicians Association.

Computer technology 

Certification is often used in the professions of software engineering and information technology.

 CITP (Chartered IT Professional) conferred by British Computer Society, The Institution of Engineering and Technology and by other professional engineering institutions in the UK and commonwealth

Contract management 

• CPCM (Certified Professional Contract Manager) conferred by the National Contract Management Association.

• CPM (Commercial Project Manager) conferred by Commercial Officers Group.

• CPSM (Certified Professional in Supply Management) conferred by Institute for Supply Management (ISM)

Dance 
Conferred by the International Dance Council CID at UNESCO, the International Certification of Dance Studies is awarded to students who have completed 150 hours of classes in a specific form of dance for Level 1. Another 150 hours are required for Level 2 and so on till Level 10. This is the only international certification for dance since the International Dance Council CID is the official body for all forms of dance; it is usually given in addition to local or national certificates, that is why it is colloquially called "the dancer's passport". Students cannot apply for this certification directly – they have to ask their school to apply on their behalf. This certification is awarded free of charge, there is no cost other than membership fees.

International Dance Council CID at UNESCO administers the International Certification of Dance Studies.

Data management 
 Business Intelligence and Data Analyst (BIDA) by Corporate Finance Institute (CFI).
 Certified Data Management Professional (CDMP) by DAMA International.

Dentistry

Electronics 
In the United States, several electronics certifications are provided by the Electronics Technicians Association.

Emergency management 

The Federal Emergency Management Agency's EMI offers credentials and training opportunities for United States citizens. Students do not have to be employed by FEMA or be federal employees for some of the programs.
 Advance Professional Series (APS) Credential
 Continuity Excellence Series, Level I and II
 Critical Infrastructure Security and Resilience
 Disaster Field Training Operations (DFTO)
 Emergency Management Professional Program (EMPP)
 Executive Fire Officer Program (EFOP)
 Integrated Emergency Management Courses (IEMC)
 Master Exercise Practitioner Program (MEPP)
 Master Trainer Program (MTP)
 Professional Development Series (PDS) Credential
 Virtual Table Top Exercise (VTTX) Series

Engineering 

Professional engineering is any act of planning, designing, composing, measuring, evaluating, inspecting, advising, reporting, directing or supervising, or managing any of the foregoing, that requires the application of engineering principles and that concerns the safeguarding of life, health, property, economic interests, the public interest or the environment.
 P.Eng. (Professional Engineer), conferred by provincial licensing bodies in Canada.
 Ir. or P.Eng. (Professional Engineer), conferred by Board of Engineers Malaysia (BEM) in Malaysia.
 PE (Professional Engineer), conferred by Pakistan Engineering Council (PEC) and state licensing bodies in the United States.
 PE (Power Engineer), conferred by provincial safety authorities in Canada.
 EUR ING (European Engineer), conferred by the European Federation of National Engineering Associations (FEANI).
 C.Eng. (Chartered Engineer), conferred by professional engineering institutions in the UK and commonwealth.
 SMIEEE (Senior member of the IEEE), a professional designation throughout all of the United States.
 CET (Certified Engineering Technologist) or AScT (Applied Science Technologist), conferred by provincial licensing bodies in Canada.
 SPE Society of Petroleum Engineers Certificate Is a program whereby it certifies the technical knowledge of petroleum engineers. The certification is granted based on an examination in conjunction with experience of the applicant.

Event planning 
Event planning includes budgeting, scheduling, site selection, acquiring necessary permits, coordinating transportation and parking, arranging for speakers or entertainers, arranging decor, event security, catering, coordinating with third-party vendors, and emergency plans.

Common event planning certifications include:
 CMP: Certified Meeting Professional
 CSEP: Certified Special Events Professional
 CPCE: Certified Professional in Catering and Events
 CGMP: Certified Government Meeting Professional
 CWEP: Certified Wedding & Event Planner

Facility management 
Facility management can be defined as an aspect of engineering management science that deals with the planning, designing, coordination of space and maintenance of a built environment to enhance quality service management system. Service Quality System includes activities like security, maintenance, catering, and external as well as internal cleaning. In general, it is also the coordination and harmonization of various specialist disciplines to create the best possible working environment for staff.

Facility management is an interdisciplinary field devoted to the coordination of space, infrastructure, people and organization, often associated with the administration of office blocks, arenas, schools, convention centers, shopping complexes, hospitals, hotels, etc. However, FM facilitates on a wider range of activities than just business services and these are referred to as non-core functions.

FMP- Facility Management Professional
CFM- Certified Facility Manager
SFP- Sustainability Facility Professional

Warehousing management 
A warehouse management system (WMS) is a part of the supply chain and primarily aims to control the movement and storage of materials within a warehouse and process the associated transactions, including shipping, receiving, putaway and picking. The systems also direct and optimize stock putaway based on real-time information about the status of bin utilization. A WMS monitors the progress of products through the warehouse. It involves the physical warehouse infrastructure, tracking systems, and communication between product stations.

More precisely, warehouse management involves the receipt, storage and movement of goods, (normally finished goods), to intermediate storage locations or to a final customer. In the multi-echelon model for distribution, there may be multiple levels of warehouses. This includes a central warehouse, a regional warehouses (serviced by the central warehouse) and potentially retail warehouses (serviced by the regional warehouses).

Environment 
 CEnvP – Certified Environmental Practitioner of Australia and New Zealand (CEnvP)
Chartered Environmentalist (CEnv), Society for the Environment (UK)
MIEMA - Full Member of the Institute of Environmental Management and Assessment (IEMA)
FIEMA - Fellow of the Institute of Environmental Management and Assessment (IEMA)

Environmental health 
 CPHI(C) – Certified Public Health Inspector (Canada)

Explosive atmospheres 
IECEx covers the specialized field of explosion protection associated with the use of equipment in areas where flammable gases, liquids and combustible dusts may be present. This system provides the assurance that equipment is manufactured to meet safety standards, and that services such as installation, repair and overhaul also comply with IEC International Standards on 60079 series. The UNECE (United Nations Economic Commission for Europe), cited IECEx as one example of a practice model for the verification of conformity to IEC Standards, for European smaller countries with no certification schemes for such equipment. It published a "Common Regulatory Framework" as a suggestion for those countries implementing a certification program for the explosive atmospheres' segment.

Fiber optics and data cabling 
 RCDD (Registered Communications Distribution Designer) by BICSI
 DCI (Data Cabling Installer) conferred by Electronics Technicians Association
 FOI (Fiber Optics Installer) conferred by Electronics Technicians Association
 FOT (Fiber Optics Technician) conferred by Electronics Technicians Association
 FOT-OSP (Fiber Optics Technician-Outside Plant) conferred by Electronics Technicians Association
 FOD (Fiber Optics Designer) conferred by Electronics Technicians Association
 TTT (Termination and Testing Technician) conferred by Electronics Technicians Association

Genealogy 
 AG (Accredited Genealogist) conferred by the International Commission for the Accreditation of Professional Genealogists (ICAPGen).
 CG (Certified Genealogist) conferred by the Board for Certification of Genealogists (BCG).
 CGL (Certified Genealogical Lecturer) conferred by the Board for Certification of Genealogists (BCG).

Health leadership 
 CHE (Certified Health Executive) conferred by the Canadian College of Health Leaders (CCHL)

Human Resources 
 aPHR (Associate Professional in Human Resources) conferred by the Human Resources Certification Institute
 PHR (Professional in Human Resources) conferred by the Human Resources Certification Institute
SPHR (Senior Professional in Human Resources) conferred by the Human Resources Certification Institute
SHRM-CP (Society for Human Resources Management – Certified Professional) conferred by the Society for Human Resources Management
SHRM-SCP (Society for Human Resources Management – Senior Certified Professional) conferred by the Society for Human Resources Management

Hospitality and tourism 

 CHA (Certified Hotel Administrator) conferred by American Hotel & Lodging Association
 CMP (Certified Meeting Professional) conferred by Convention Industry Council
 CEM (Certified in Exhibition Management) conferred by International Association of Exhibitions and Events

Insurance and risk management 
In the United States, insurance professionals are licensed separately by each state. Many individuals seek one or more certifications to distinguish themselves from their peers.

 American College of Financial Services:
 Chartered Life Underwriter (CLU)
 Chartered Financial Consultant (ChFC)
 American Institute For Chartered Property Casualty Underwriters (The Institutes):
 Chartered Property Casualty Underwriter (CPCU®)
 Associate in Risk Management (ARM)
 National Alliance for Insurance Education & Research administers the Certified Insurance Counselor (CIC)
 Professional Liability Underwriting Society (PLUS) administers Registered Professional Liability Underwriter (RPLU).
 American Educational Institute (AEI)
 Accredited Claims Adjuster	(ACA)
 Accredited Claims Professional	(ACP)
 Accredited Claims Professional Candidate	(ACAc)
 Associate in Claims	(AIC)
 Applied Microbial Remediation Technician	AMRC
 Casualty General Adjuster	(CGA)
 Certified Claims Adjuster	(CCA)
 Certified Claims Professional	(CCP)
 Certified Claims Professional Candidate	(CCPc)
 Chartered Property Casualty Underwriter candidate	(CPCUc)
 Certied Forensic Litigation Consultant	(CFLC)
 Certified General Adjuster	(CrtGA)
 Certified Mold Specialist	(CMS)
 Certified Mold Inspector	(CMI)
 Certified Property Appraiser and Umpire	(CPAU)
 Certified Property Loss Appraiser	(CPLA)
 Certified Property Loss Umpire	(CPLU)
 Casualty General Adjuster	(CGA)
 Certified General Adjuster	(CrtGA)
 Casualty General Adjuster	(CGA)
 Executive General Adjuster	(EGA)
 Fire & Smoke Restoration Technician	(FSRT)
 GrandMaster General Adjuster	(GMGA)
 HAAG Engineering Certified Roofing Inspector Residential/Commercial	(HCI-R/C)
 Insurance Claims Expert	(ICE)
 Legal Principles Claims Specialist	(LPCS)
 Master General Adjuster	(MGA)
 Master Public Adjuster	(MPA)
 Property Claims Law Associate	(PCLA)
 Property General Adjuster	(PGA)
 Registered General Adjuster	(RGA)
 Senior Professional Public Adjuster (SPPA)
 Universal Claims Certification	(UCC)
 Windstorm Insurance Network Professional	(WIND-P)
 Water Remediaton Technician	(WRT)

Language education 
TESOL is a large field of employment with widely varying degrees of regulation. Most provision worldwide is through the state school system of each individual country, and as such, the instructors tend to be trained primary- or secondary school teachers who are native speakers of the language of their pupils, and not of English. Though native speakers of English have been working in non-English speaking countries in this capacity for years, it was not until the last twenty-five years or so that there was any widespread focus on training particularly for this field. Previously, workers in this sort of job were people engaging in backpacker tourism hoping to earn some extra travel money or well-educated professionals in other fields volunteering, or retired people. These sort of people are certainly still to be found, but there are many who consider TESOL their main profession.

One of the problems facing these full-time teachers is the absence of an international governing body for the certification or licensure of English language teachers. However, Cambridge University and its subsidiary body UCLES are pioneers in trying to get some degree of accountability and quality control to consumers of English courses, through their CELTA and DELTA programs. Trinity College London has equivalent programs, the CertTESOL and the LTCL DipTESOL. They offer initial certificates in teaching, in which candidates are trained in language awareness and classroom techniques, and given a chance to practice teaching, after which feedback is reported. Both institutions have as a follow-up a professional diploma, usually taken after a year or two in the field. Although the initial certificate is available to anyone with a high school education, the diploma is meant to be a post-graduate qualification and can in fact be incorporated into a master's degree program.

Legal affairs 

An increasing number of attorneys are choosing to be recognized as having special expertise in certain fields of law. According to the American Bar Association, a lawyer who is a certified specialist has been recognized by an independent professional certifying organization as having an enhanced level of skill and expertise, as well as substantial involvement in an established legal specialty. These organizations require a lawyer to demonstrate special training, experience and knowledge to ensure that the lawyer's recognition is meaningful and reliable. Lawyer conduct with regard to specialty certification is regulated by the states.

Legal administrators vary in their day-to-day responsibilities and job requirements. The Association of Legal Administrators (ALA) is the credentialing body of the Certified Legal Manager (CLM) certification program. CLMs are recognized as administrators who have passed a comprehensive examination and have met other eligibility requirements.:

Librarians 
In Australia, ALIA (Australian Library and Information Association) certifies librarians and library technicians. Distinguished librarians who have completed a high level of professional learning are awarded the Distinguished Certified Professional Award. Prior to 2013, this award was known as Associate Fellows.

In New Zealand, the accrediting body is LIANZA (Library and Information Association of New Zealand Aotearoa Te Rau Herenga O Aotearoa). LIANZA accredit prominent librarians at three levels, Fellows, Life Members and Associates.

Logistics and transport 
Logistician is the profession in the logistics and transport sectors, including sea, air, land and rail modes. Professional qualification for logisticians usually carries post-nominal letters.

Certification granting bodies include, but are not limited to, Institute for Supply Management (ISM), Association for Operations Management (APICS), Chartered Institute of Logistics and Transport (CILT), International Society of Logistics (SOLE), Canadian Institute of Traffic and Transportation (CITT), and Allied Council for Commerce and Logistics (ACCL).

Management Consulting 
Management consulting is the practice of providing consulting services to organizations to improve their performance or in any way to assist in achieving any sort of organizational objectives.

The profession's primary certification is the "Certified Management Consultant" (CMC) designation.

Certification granting bodies are the approximately 50 Institutes of Management Consulting belonging to the International Council of Management Consulting Institutes (ICMCI).

Marketing 
 CDMP (Certified Digital Marketing Professional), conferred by Digital Marketing Institute.
 CME (Certified Marketing Executive), conferred by Sales & Marketing Executives International, Inc..
 CyQUal (Cyber qualification), The Digital Degree Accredited certification offered by FreeUniversityOnline.com
 Social Media Marketing Certification, Digital Marketing Master Certification, SEO Certification, conferred by Boot Camp Digital

Ministers 
Churches have their own process of who may use various religious titles. Protestant churches typically require a Masters of Divinity, accreditation by the denomination and ordination by the local church in order for a minister to become a "Reverend". Those qualifications may or may not also give government authorization to solemnize marriages.

Medicine 

Board certification is the process by which a physician in the United States documents by written, practical or computer based testing, illustrating a mastery of knowledge and skills that define a particular area of medical specialization. The American Board of Medical Specialties, a not-for-profit organization, assists 24 approved medical specialty boards in the development and use of standards in the ongoing evaluation and certification of physicians.

Medical specialty certification in the United States is a voluntary process. While medical licensure sets the minimum competency requirements to diagnose and treat patients, it is not specialty specific. Board certification demonstrates a physician's exceptional expertise in a particular specialty or sub-specialty of medical practice.

Patients, physicians, health care providers, insurers and quality organizations regard certification as an important measure of a physician's knowledge, experience and skills to provide quality health care within a given specialty.

Other professional certifications include certifications such as medical licenses, Membership of the Royal College of Physicians, Fellowship of the Royal College of Physicians and Surgeons of Canada, nursing board certification, diplomas in social work. The Commission for Certification in Geriatric Pharmacy certifies pharmacists that are knowledgeable about principles of geriatric pharmacotherapy and the provision of pharmaceutical care to the elderly. Additional certifying bodies relating to the medical field include:
 Royal Australian and New Zealand College of Radiologists
 American College of Emergency Physicians
 Royal Australasian College of Physicians
 Fellowship of the Royal College of Surgeons
 Membership of the College of Emergency Medicine
 Joint Commission on Allied Health Personnel in Ophthalmology
 American Registry for Diagnostic Medical Sonography

Medical coding and billing 
 AHIMA (American Health Information Management Association)
 AAPC
 Medical Association of Billers

Peer support 
NCPRP stands for "National Certified Peer Recovery Professional", and the NCPRP credential and exam were developed in collaboration with the International Certification Board of Recovery Professionals (ICBRP) and is currently being administered by PARfessionals.

PARfessionals is a professional organization and all of the available courses are professional development and pre-certification courses.

The NCPRP credential and exam focus primarily on the concept of peer recovery through mental health and addiction recovery. It has the main purpose of training student-candidates on how to become peer recovery professionals who can provide guidance, knowledge or assistance for individuals who have had similar experiences.

Each student-candidate must complete several key steps which include initial registration; the pre-certification review course; and all applicable sections of the official application in order to become eligible to complete the final step, which is the NCPRP certification exam.

The NCPRP credential is obtained once a participant successfully passes the NCPRP certification exam by the second attempt and is valid for five years.

Physical asset management 
 CMRP – Certified Maintenance and Reliability Professional (CMRP)
 MMP – Maintenance Management Professional

Pilates 

 PMA(R) CPT

Plumbing 
 ASSE (American Society of Sanitary Engineering) – an ANSI Accredited standards developer and certification body

Project management 

Organizations that offer various certifications include:
 American Academy of Project Management
 Project Management Institute
 Stanford University through the Stanford Advanced Project Management Certificate Program
 CPMA (Certified Project Management Analyst) conferred by IQN
 Association for Project Management
 IPMA (International Project Management Association)
 Commercial Project Manager through Commercial Officers Group

Public health 
National Board of Public Health Examiners, www.nbphe.org

Public relations 
In the US, the Universal Accreditation Board, an organization composed of the Public Relations Society of America, the Agricultural Relations Council, the National School Public Relations Association, the Religious Communicators Council and other public relations professional societies, administers the Accreditation in Public Relations (APR), a voluntary certification program for public relations practitioners.

Public Participation 
The Certified Public Participation Professional (CP3) and Master Certified Public Participation Professional (MCP3) are awarded by two regions of the International Association for Public Participation (IAP2) : IAP2 Canada and IAP2 USA. As of 2019, only 25 individuals had achieved either of these distinctions. The CP3 designation is awarded upon successfully completing a three-step process that includes a written application documenting the individual's experience in the profession, a written response to a case study, and an in-person oral assessment.

Individuals seeking certification are assessed against 5 Core Competencies, which are the essential capabilities for a professional in this field to effectively design, implement, and evaluate public participation programs. The competencies emerged from qualitative analysis of a comprehensive list of knowledge, attitudes, beliefs, skills, behaviors, and capabilities identified in June 2014 by more than 100 P2 professionals from around the world. The descriptions and quality standards for each competency were developed, tested, and refined through an iterative process involving IAP2 members. Each competency is further divided into individual criteria. An individual must meet or exceed every criterion to achieve the CP3 designation. IAP2 USA's program includes 29 criteria. IAP2 Canada's program includes 31 criteria; the two additional criteria in Canada address federal requirements for indigenous engagement. The MCP3 designation recognizes additional specialization and expertise and is assessed through a written application available only to individuals who have already achieved the CP3 designation.

To maintain professional certification, individuals must maintain active membership in IAP2, provide a minimum of 20 hours (annually) of volunteer (unpaid) service to IAP2, and participate in a minimum of 12 hours (annually) of continued professional development.

Real estate management
The Building Owners and Managers Association  and the International Facility Management Association offer professional certifications for the operation and management of commercial properties.

Renewable energy 
 PVIP (PV Installation Professional) conferred by North American Board of Certified Energy Practitioners
 PVDS (PV Design Specialist) conferred by North American Board of Certified Energy Practitioners
 PVIS (PV Installation Specialist) conferred by North American Board of Certified Energy Practitioners
 PVCMS (PV Commissioning & Maintenance Specialist) conferred by North American Board of Certified Energy Practitioners
 PVSI (PV System Inspector) conferred by North American Board of Certified Energy Practitioners
 PVTS (PV Technical Sales) conferred by North American Board of Certified Energy Practitioners
 SHI (Solar Heating Installer) conferred by North American Board of Certified Energy Practitioners
 SHSI (Solar Heating System Inspector conferred by North American Board of Certified Energy Practitioners
 EVT (Electronic Vehicle Technician) conferred by Electronics Technicians Association
 PVI (Photovoltaic Installer) conferred by Electronics Technicians Association
 SWI (Small Wind Installer) conferred by Electronics Technicians Association

Safety and Occupational Hygiene
 Certified Safety Professional offered by the Board of Certified Safety Professionals
 Certified Industrial Hygienist
 Certified Safety Specialist

Sales 
Organizations offering certification include:
 Sales & Marketing Executives International
 Canadian Professional Sales Association

Security 
 ASIS International administers the Certified Protection Professional – Board-Certified in Security Management (CPP)
 ASIS International administers the Physical Security Professional, Board-Certified (PSP)
 ASIS International administers the Professional Certified Investigator, Board-Certified (PCI)
 Association of Certified Fraud Examiners administers the Certified Fraud Examiner (CFE)
 International Foundation of Protection Officers administers the Certified Protection Officer (CPO)
 Society of Payment Security Professionals (SPSP) administers the Certified Payment-Card Industry Security Manager
 Certified Information Systems Security Professional (CISSP) from ISC2.org
 National Sheriffs' Association administers the Certified Homeland Protection Professional (CHPP) Certification
 Associated Locksmiths of America administers the Registered Locksmith (RL) Certification
 Associated Locksmiths of America administers the Certified Registered Locksmith (CRL) Certification
 Associated Locksmiths of America administers the Certified Professional Locksmith (CPL) Certification
 Associated Locksmiths of America administers the Certified Master Locksmith (CML) Certification
 Associated Locksmiths of America administers the Certified Professional Safe Technician (CPS) Certification
 Associated Locksmiths of America administers the Certified Master Safe Technician (CMST) Certification
 Security Industry Association administers the Certified Security Project Manager (CSPM) Certification

Speaking 
Conferred by the National Speakers Association, the Certified Speaking Professional (CSP) is the speaking profession's international measure of professional platform competence. This certification is awarded by the National Speakers Association. Only about 10% of the speakers who belong to the Global Speakers Federation (GSF) hold this designation. Those who have earned their certification have done so by demonstrating a track record of experience and expertise.

Other applications 
 The American Academy of Environmental Engineers board certifies licensed environmental engineers (Board Certified Environmental Engineer—BCEE) and unlicensed environmental engineering practitioners (Board Certified Environmental Engineering Member—BCEEM) for those with a degree in engineering and at least 8 years of practice and responsible charge in environmental engineering.
 The American Institute of Floral Designers offers two levels of certification for individuals in the field of professional floral design. Certified Floral Designer (CFD) and accredited membership (AIFD) are both designed to establish a gold standard in professional floral design while ensuring the certified individual maintains that standard through continued education credits. While many state-level floral associations also offer state-level floral design certification known as Master Florist certification, AIFD certification is the highest level of professional floral design awarded in the United States.
 The Canadian National Association of Infrared Imaging Technologists (AIIT) awards the IIT designation to infrared thermographers who meet the training standards regulated by the association. AIIT aims to ensure service delivery standards and public trust through regulating training standards, codes of conduct and continuing education.
 The Society for Technical Communication (STC) is planning to create a certification program for technical writers in 2011.
 The International Society of Arboriculture (ISA) is the International body who administers ANSI-accredited certification programs for arborists and tree care specialists. Certifications vary from Tree Worker to Certified Arborist to Master Arborist.

Criticisms 
Political commentators have criticized professional or occupational licensing, especially medical and legal licensing, for restricting the supply of services and therefore making them more expensive, often putting them out of reach of the poor.

The proliferation of IT certifications (both offered and attained) has led some technologists to question their value. Proprietary content that has been distributed on the Internet allows some to gain credentials without the implied depth or breadth of expertise.

See also 
 Academic inflation
 European professional qualification directives
 Homologation
 Institute for Certification of Computing Professionals
 Product certification
 Vocational Competence Certificate

References 

Professional ethics
all
Standards